Vasbert Conniel Drakes (born 5 August 1969 in Springhead, Saint Andrew, Barbados) is a former West Indian cricketer, who played Tests and ODIs. He was a right-arm medium-fast bowler and handy right-hand lower order batsman. 

Drakes featured for Sussex, Nottinghamshire, Warwickshire, Leicestershire and Border in his cricketing career. He also coached the UAE, Barbados and the West Indies women's cricket team.

International career
Drakes made his international debut in 1994–95, when he played 5 ODI games against Australia cricket team, followed by a tour of England. He did not return to the side until the age of 33, when in September 2002 he was named in the West Indies cricket team' squad for the 2002 ICC Champions Trophy.

He took the wicket of Jacques Kallis in his first international over for seven years. He went on to make his test debut, on 8 December 2002, against Bangladesh at Dhaka's Bangabandhu National Stadium. Drakes then took 5 wickets against Australia in the first test of the 2003 Frank Worrel Trophy series played at Bourda. This was his first and only five wicket haul in test match cricket. With the bat he scored a notable unbeaten 27 which helped the Windies to chase down a world-record target of 418, set by Australia cricket team in the fourth test of the series played at the Antigua Recreation Ground. He later made 67 in a test match played in and against South Africa. This was his first and only half century in international cricket. 

Drakes also featured in the 2003 ICC World Cup where he took a spectacular diving catch in a game against Canada. He eventually picked up a sum of 51 wickets at an average of 25.35 with two five wicket hauls in his ODI career.

Domestic career
Drakes played county cricket for English sides Sussex, Nottinghamshire, Warwickshire and Leicestershire. He scored two centuries for Sussex and picked up 80 wickets in his first and only season with Nottinghamshire.
He also featured for South African club Border, with Drakes twice being named, in 1999 and 2000, as one of the  South African Cricketers of the Year.

Drakes is also one of only six batsmen in the history of first-class cricket to be given out timed out. As he wasn't in the country at the time, his flight to South Africa, to attend a match played between Border and Free State, had been delayed by several hours.

Coaching career 
After his cricketing career, Drakes was appointed coach of United Arab Emirates national cricket team for a three-month period that included the 2008 Asia Cup and 2008 ACC Trophy Elite. Then he took over coaching for Barbados cricket team. He was also briefly the coach of Queen's Park Cricket Club.

In April 2015, Drakes was name head coach of West Indies women's cricket team. He led the West Indies women's cricket team to their first major title by winning the 2016 ICC Women's World Twenty20 in India.

Personal life
Drakes's son, Dominic Drakes is also a cricketer who's a left arm seamer.

References

External links 
 Cricinfo

1969 births
Living people
West Indies One Day International cricketers
West Indies Test cricketers
Barbadian cricketers
Scotland cricketers
Barbados cricketers
Sussex cricketers
Border cricketers
Nottinghamshire cricketers
Warwickshire cricketers
Leicestershire cricketers
Cricketers at the 1998 Commonwealth Games
Cricketers at the 2003 Cricket World Cup
People from Saint Andrew, Barbados
Barbadian cricket coaches
Coaches of the United Arab Emirates national cricket team
Commonwealth Games competitors for Barbados